Warriors Path State Park is a Pennsylvania state park on  in Liberty Township, Bedford County, Pennsylvania, in the United States.  It is named for the Great Indian Warpath that was used by the Iroquois in war raids with the Cherokee and other tribes. Warriors Path State Park is surrounded on three sides by the Raystown Branch Juniata River. The park is a seasonal day use park. The park can be accessed by foot from the main gate when the gate is closed November through mid-April.

The land for the park was acquired in three main parcels between 1959 and 1964. A stone with a bronze marker remembers the gift by Mr. and Mrs. Samuel Bussard of one parcel, stating that the land will "be maintained and used as a park forever".  were originally purchased from the Nimchishin family in 1959. Mr. Nimchishin lived on the remaining  until his death, but sold that land to the state in 1987 and it became part of the park.

Raystown Branch of the Juniata River
The Raystown Branch of the Juniata River is accessed from the park for fishing and boating. The river is home to smallmouth and rock bass, carp, sucker, eel, catfish, walleye, and muskellunge. The waters of the river are usually too shallow for motorboating during the summer months, but Raystown Branch is ideal for canoes, rafts and other small boats. All boats must have a current registration with any state. Backflow from the river has created a fresh water swamp that provides habitat for wood ducks, river otter and mallards.

Trails
The trails of Warriors Path State Park are open to hiking and cross-country skiing. The trails also provide access to the woods for hunters during hunting season. All hikers and skiers are asked to wear blaze orange during the hunting seasons.

Hunting
Hunting is permitted at Warriors Path State Park.  Hunters are expected to follow the rules and regulations of the Pennsylvania State Game Commission. The common game species are ruffed grouse, squirrels, turkey, white-tailed deer, pheasant, and rabbits. The hunting of groundhogs is prohibited.

Nearby state parks
The following state parks are within  of Warriors Path State Park:
Blue Knob State Park (Bedford County)
Buchanan's Birthplace State Park (Franklin County)
Canoe Creek State Park (Blair County)
Cowans Gap State Park (Fulton County)
Shawnee State Park (Bedford County)
Trough Creek State Park (Huntingdon County)

References

External links

  

State parks of Pennsylvania
Protected areas established in 1965
Parks in Bedford County, Pennsylvania
Protected areas of Bedford County, Pennsylvania